Wilson David "Buster" Charles, Jr. (April 4, 1908 – June 6, 2006) was a Native American athlete who finished fourth in the decathlon at the 1932 Summer Olympics. He also competed nationally in basketball and American football. After retiring from sports he worked as an engineer in Phoenix, Arizona. He was inducted into the National Hall of Fame for Famous American Indians.

References

1908 births
2006 deaths
People from De Pere, Wisconsin
Track and field athletes from Phoenix, Arizona
Native American sportspeople
Native American basketball players
Native American people from Wisconsin
Track and field athletes from Wisconsin
American male decathletes
Olympic track and field athletes of the United States
Athletes (track and field) at the 1932 Summer Olympics